Immortality height is a memorial complex founded in 1967 on the right coast of the Seversky Donets in the Atayevo village, the city Belaya Kalitva.

History 
The complex is devoted to the military of Cavalry squadrons of the 112nd Bashkir Cavalry Division 8-th kavkorpusa, they were led by Lieutenant Annaklych Atayev.

In January 1943, during liberating fights for Belaya Kalitva, the military of a squadron reached a height which was rising above the neighboring territory, fought against infantry battalion using automatic machines with assistance of ten tanks, artillery and mortar fire. That way, they have made a powerful contribution to successful release of the city from Nazis.

The lieutenant A. Atayev has been posthumously awarded by the decision of Presidium of the Supreme Council of the USSR a rank of the Hero of the Soviet Union, and his subordinating divisions also have received posthumous awards of Patriotic war of the I degree.

Originally, the monument represented three steles and an eternal flame. Later — to the 40 anniversary of the Victory — between steles the sculpture of the grieving Motherland with a laurel wreath in a hand has been placed. On a semicircle of a wall memorable plates with the cut names of heroes are established, and through all memorial there is an inscription "Memories of Fallen — Be Worthy".

References 
 Курган бессмертия.

Tourist attractions in Rostov Oblast
World War II memorials in Russia
Monuments and memorials in Rostov Oblast